Olivier Roumat (born 16 June 1966 in Mont-de-Marsan) is a former French rugby union footballer. He played as a number-eight, openside flanker and lock.

Club career
Roumat first played at Villeneuve-de-Marsan, moving then to US Dax, where he premiered at 1985/86. He was a member of the winning side of the Currie Cup. He was back at US Dax for the 1996/97 season. Roumat then would play for Stade Français, for 1997/98, and for Biarritz Olympique, from 1998/99 to 2002/03. He won the title of French Champion with Stade Français, in 1997/98, and with Biarritz Olympique, in 2001/02. He also won the South African Currie Cup in 1995.

International career
Roumat won 61 caps for France, from 1989 to 1996, scoring 5 tries, 23 points in aggregate. He captained the national team on 8 occasions, from 1993 to 1994. He played for France at the 1991 Rugby World Cup, in four matches, scoring a try. France was knocked out of that World Cup by England (the eventual losing finalist) at the quarter final stage. Roumat also represented France at the 1995 Rugby World Cup, appearing once again in five matches and scoring another try. This time France would finish the tournament in 3rd place, triumphing over England in the 3rd/4th place playoff after both teams were defeated at the semi final stage. Roumat played in the Five Nations, in 1991, 1992, 1993, 1994, 1995 and 1996. He was a member of the Championship winning team in 1993.

Honours
 Stade Français
French Rugby Union Championship/Top 14: 1997–98

References

External links
Olivier Roumat International Statistics

1966 births
Living people
French rugby union players
US Dax players
Stade Français players
Sharks (Currie Cup) players
Biarritz Olympique players
Rugby union number eights
Rugby union flankers
Rugby union locks
France international rugby union players
Sportspeople from Landes (department)
French expatriate rugby union players
Expatriate rugby union players in South Africa
French expatriate sportspeople in South Africa